The Windover Archeological Site is a Middle Archaic (6000 to 5000 BC) archaeological site and National Historic Landmark in Brevard County near Titusville, Florida, United States, on the central east coast of the state. Windover is a muck pond where skeletal remains of 168 individuals were found buried in the peat at the bottom of the pond. The skeletons were well preserved because of the characteristics of peat. In addition, remarkably well-preserved brain tissue has been recovered from many skulls from the site. DNA from the brain tissue has been sequenced.  The collection of human skeletal remains and artifacts recovered from Windover Pond represent among the largest finds of each type from the Archaic Period. It is considered one of the most important archeological sites ever excavated.

As the sea level was considerably lower 7,000 to 8,000 years ago than it is today, the pond originally sat above the water table, and was filled only by rainfall and runoff from the surrounding land. At that time the pond had a relatively thin layer of peat under a thin layer of water. The subsequent rise in sea level raised the local water table, and in more recent times the pond has been fed by groundwater as well as rainfall. In 1984 the pond had a thick layer of peat, with five strata described by the archaeologists who excavated the pond.

Discovery and excavation 

The site was discovered in 1982 when work began on building a road across the pond in a new housing development, Windover Farms. A backhoe operator noticed several skulls in the bucket of his machine. The sheriff and medical examiner determined that the burials were not recent. The local forensic expert originally believed he was examining modern Caucasian remains.

The developers, Jack Eckerd and Jim Swann, halted construction at the pond and called in archaeologists. Radiocarbon dating on two bones excavated from the pond by the backhoe, paid for by the developers, yielded dates of 7,210 years and 7,320 years Before Present, establishing the importance of the find. The developers changed their overall plans in order to preserve the pond intact and donated $60,000 worth of pumping equipment to drain the pond for excavation.

The state approved funding to excavate the pond in 1984. The work was carried out under the direction of Glen Doran and David Dickel of Florida State University. Researchers used a network of 160 wells around the pond to lower the water table enough to permit excavation of the peat. The workers used shovels and hand tools to remove the peat until the level of the burials was reached. One of the lead archaeologists compared excavating the peat to trying to dig chocolate mousse under water. Only half of the pond was excavated, with the remainder left undisturbed for future investigation.

Human remains 

The remains found included bones of males and females of all ages from infants to about 60 years, a total of 168 individuals. Children constituted about half the remains. Skeletons showed the effects of disease and healed wounds, allowing forensic studies. Many bones of children showed interrupted growth, perhaps due to severe disease or malnutrition. Osteoporosis was evident in older females. Adults of both sexes exhibited a high incidence of osteoarthritis, which is another continuing problem for humans. Some skeletons showed wounds from conflict that were likely the cause of death. The pelvis of one male had a bone spear point embedded in it. Others had severe skull fractures.

Children and teenagers were buried with more grave goods than were adults, indicating the high value placed on children. Skeletons included one of a male aged about 15 who had spina bifida.  All of his bones were found to have been fragile. One of his feet was missing and the stump of his lower leg had healed. As his spinal condition almost certainly meant the boy was paralyzed below the waist, this find was important for assessing the society's commitment to ensuring his survival for 15 years in a hunter-gatherer community.

While some of the remains were mixed, about 100 undisturbed burials were found with fully articulated bones, in roughly the correct position and relationship in the body. Most were buried in a flexed position, on their left sides, and with their heads toward the west. The bodies were held down in the graves by sharpened stakes. The bodies were buried in clusters, in five or six episodes of short duration that were scattered over a thousand years. Thirty-seven of the graves contained woven fabrics which demonstrate a relatively complex weaving technique and indicate that the bodies had been wrapped for burial.

In late 1984 the archaeologists discovered that brain tissue had survived in many of the skulls. Lumps of greasy, brownish material were found in several skulls when they were opened for examination. Suspecting that this was brain tissue, the researchers sent the intact skulls for X-ray, CAT scans and magnetic resonance imaging (MRI), which showed recognizable brain structures. In addition, cell structures were seen under a microscope. At least 90 of the recovered bodies had brain tissue that survived, due to the preservative effects of the peat. The state of preservation of the brain tissues allowed a determination that the bodies were buried in the peat within 24 to 48 hours after death. This preservation allowed researchers to sequence DNA from the brains. The DNA indicated Asian origin, similar to that of the four other major haplotypes of Native American peoples, and a relatively rare haplogroup, X. The DNA also indicated that one family had used this grave site for over a century.

Gut contents were found with many of the burials. These included seeds of wild grapes, elderberries and prickly pear fruit, often in large quantities. The people's teeth were worn down early in life, presumably from sand in the food, but few had cavities.

Artifacts 

Many artifacts that were deposited with the bodies were also preserved.  Archaeologists at this site were able to recover a total of 86 pieces of fabric from 37 graves. These included seven different textile weaves, which appeared to have been used for clothing, bags, matting, and possibly blankets and ponchos. Numerous other artifacts, such as atlatls and projectile points, were also found at Windover. The occupants of Windover hunted animals, fished, and gathered plants. They used bottle gourds for storage, which comprise the earliest evidence for vegetable container storage discovered in North America. Animal bones and shells found in the graves indicated that the people ate white-tailed deer, raccoon, opossum, birds, fish and shellfish.

Water burials
Windover is one of a number of Archaic period sites in Florida with underwater burials in peat. Similar burials occurred at Little Salt Spring (in Sarasota County) 5,200 to 6,800 years ago, Bay West (in Collier County) 5,940 to 6,840 years ago, and Republic Grove (in Hardee County) 5,690 to 6,470 years ago. It has multiple burials in multiple areas. The burial site was a freshwater peat pond when the burials occurred 7,200 years ago.

At Windover, stakes were driven into the peat through fabrics wrapped around the bodies. Similar stakes were found associated with burials at Bay West, Republic Grove, and Manasota Key Offshore. The stakes may have been used to help hold the bodies underwater. There were also burials (although not in peat) in the sinkhole at Warm Mineral Springs, dating as much as 12,000 years ago. Robin Brown notes in connection with these underwater burials that many Native American groups have a tradition that spirits of the dead are blocked by water.  As recently as 1,500 to 2,000 years ago, bundled, defleshed bones were stored on a wooden platform set in the middle of a pond at Fort Center.

Significance
Windover Pond is one of a number of sites in Florida excavated since 1970 that have led to a major reassessment of the Archaic period in Florida. Jerald T. Milanich states that Windover has provided "unprecedented and dramatic" information about the early Archaic people in Florida, and that the Windover site may be "one of the most significant archaeological sites ever excavated."  The site was designated a National Historic Landmark in 1987 in recognition of this significance.

References

Bibliography

Further reading
Tuross, Noreen, et al.  "Subsistence in the Florida Archaic: The Stable-Isotope and Archaeobotanical Evidence from the Windover Site".  American Antiquity 59.2 (1994): 288–303.
Wentz, Rachel. "Life and Death at Windover:Excavations of a 7,000 Year-Old Pond Cemetery". 2012.

External links 

 Brevard County listings at Florida's Office of Cultural and Historical Programs
 Windover Archeological Site at National Historic Landmarks Program
America's Bog People
Windover Burial Site at A History of Central Florida Podcast

Archaic period in North America
Archaeological sites in Florida
National Historic Landmarks in Florida
National Register of Historic Places in Brevard County, Florida
Prehistoric burials
Underwater archaeological sites